Administrative Science may refer to:
 The study of public administration, governance, or management
 Administrative Science Quarterly, an academic journal established in 1956
 Journal of Administrative Sciences, an academic journal published since 2003 in English and Turkish